Streptomyces diastatochromogenes is a bacterium species from the genus of Streptomyces. Streptomyces diastatochromogenes produces polyketomycin, concanamycin A, concanamycin B, concanamycin C, momofulvenone A, azdimycin, toyocamycin and oligomycins.

See also 
 List of Streptomyces species

References

Further reading

External links
Type strain of Streptomyces diastatochromogenes at BacDive -  the Bacterial Diversity Metadatabase

diastatochromogenes
Bacteria described in 1948